Valentin Huot (1 May 1929 – 21 November 2017) was a French racing cyclist. He won the French national road race title in 1957 and 1958. Huot died on 21 November 2017, aged 88.

References

External links
 

1929 births
2017 deaths
French male cyclists
Sportspeople from Dordogne
Cyclists from Nouvelle-Aquitaine